Diane Edith Watson (born November 12, 1933) is a former American politician who served as US Representative for , serving from 2003 until 2011, after first being elected in the 32nd District in a 2001 special election. She is a member of the Democratic Party. The district is located entirely in Los Angeles County and includes much of Central Los Angeles, as well as such wealthy neighborhoods as Los Feliz.

A native of Los Angeles, Watson is a graduate of the University of California, Los Angeles, and also holds degrees from California State University, Los Angeles and Claremont Graduate University. She worked as a psychologist, professor, and health occupation specialist before serving as a member of the Los Angeles Unified School Board (1975–78). She was a member of the California Senate from 1978 to 1998, and the US Ambassador to Micronesia from 1999 to 2000.

Watson was elected to Congress in a 2001 special election to fill the vacancy caused by the death of Representative Julian C. Dixon. She was re-elected four times, and retired after the end of the 111th Congress.

Early life, education and career

Born in Los Angeles, California, Watson was raised Catholic as the daughter of William Allen Louis Watson and Dorothy Elizabeth O’Neal Watson.  According to a DNA analysis, some of her ancestors were from the Central African Republic. She was educated at Dorsey High School, Los Angeles City College and the University of California, Los Angeles, where she earned her BA in Education (1956) and became a member of Alpha Kappa Alpha.

She earned an MS from California State University, Los Angeles in School Psychology (1967) and a PhD in Educational Administration from Claremont Graduate University in 1987. She also attended Harvard Kennedy School at Harvard University.

Watson taught elementary school and was a school psychologist in the Los Angeles public schools.  She has lectured at California State University, Long Beach and California State University, Los Angeles. She was a health occupation specialist with the California Department of Education's Bureau of Industrial Education and served on the unified Los Angeles school board.

Early political career
Watson was elected to the California State Senate from 1978 to 1998.  The longtime chair of the Health and Human Services Committee, she gained a reputation as an advocate for health care for the poor and children. She was the first African American woman in the California State Senate. Term limited, she was replaced by Kevin Murray.

When, in 1988, the US government proposed the addition of the category of "bi-racial" or "multiracial" to official documents and statistics, some African American organizations and African American leaders such as Watson and Representative Augustus Hawkins were particularly vocal in their rejection of and opposition to the category.  They feared massive defection from the African American self-designation.

In 1992, Watson ran for the Los Angeles County Board of Supervisors.  After a hard-fought campaign that often turned negative, Watson narrowly lost to former Supervisor Yvonne Burke, who was supported by U.S. Representative Maxine Waters.

In 1999, President Bill Clinton appointed her United States Ambassador to Micronesia and she served in the post for two years. She stepped down to run in the April 2001 Democratic primary election, which was called to nominate a candidate to replace Congressman Julian Dixon, who had died in office five months earlier. She won with 33 percent of the vote in a multi-candidate field, then carried the district with 75 percent of the vote in the June 2001 special election.

U.S. House of Representatives

Committee assignments
Committee on Foreign Affairs
Subcommittee on Africa and Global Health
Subcommittee on Asia, the Pacific, and the Global Environment
Subcommittee on Terrorism, Nonproliferation, and Trade
Committee on Oversight and Government Reform
Subcommittee on Domestic Policy
Subcommittee on Government Management, Organization, and Procurement (Chairwoman)
Subcommittee on Information Policy, Census, and National Archives

Caucuses
Chair of the Congressional Entertainment Industries Caucus
Co-chair of the Congressional Korea Caucus
Co-chair of the U.S.-UK Caucus
Congressional Black Caucus

Racism 
In Congress, she became a vocal leader on issues related to racism and xenophobia, supporting reparations for descendants of American slaves, reform of the educational system, subsidies for families lacking health care, and a comprehensive overhaul of the nation’s criminal justice system. She also decried incidents of violence and racism against Arab Americans that she believed were a result of retribution for the September 11, 2001, terrorist attacks.

Objection to 2004 Presidential Election results
She was one of 31 House Democrats who voted not to count the 20 electoral votes from Ohio in the 2004 United States presidential election. President George Bush won the state by 118,457 votes. Without Ohio's electoral votes, the election would have been decided by the U.S. House of Representatives, with each state having one vote in accordance with the Twelfth Amendment to the United States Constitution.

Opposition to policies of President George W. Bush
Congresswoman Watson supported withdrawal of U.S. troops from Iraq, opposed media consolidation,  supported expanding welfare coverage, and opposed President Bush's proposal to privatize Social Security.  Watson opposed the Bush tax cuts, saying they were unaffordable.

Cherokee Nation
On the issue of Cherokee Freedmen membership in the Cherokee tribe, Watson noted that 20,000 Cherokee lived in California.  She opposed the Cherokee Nation's March 2007 vote to amend its constitution to limit membership to only those descendants with at least one Indian ancestor on the Dawes Roll.  She noted that when freedmen were granted citizenship in the tribe in 1866 by a treaty which the Cherokees made with the US government, it was without restriction to those freedmen with Indian ancestry. Appeals to the Cherokee Nation's position were pending, in part because the tribe excluded descendants of Cherokee freedmen and intermarried whites from voting on the amendment.  In June 2007 Watson introduced a bill to sever US relations with the tribe and revoke its gaming privileges unless the Cherokee restored membership in the tribe to descendants of Cherokee freedmen. This drew the ire of several tribal leaders and individuals in Indian Country, accusing her of racism or bias against Native people.

Other issues

In 2006, the National Journal ranked Watson as the most liberal member of Congress.

Throughout her career in Congress, she advocated for increased funding and research directed at the HIV/AIDS pandemic. She argued in favor of humanitarian assistance for African nations that had been decimated by the disease.

Political campaigns
In the 2008 Democratic primary, Watson's district went overwhelmingly for Illinois Senator Barack Obama by a margin of 61-29. As a superdelegate, Watson continued to support New York Senator Hillary Clinton.

Watson defeated her challengers in the California June 3 primary, and defeated Republican David Crowley in the November 4, 2008, election.

See also
 List of African-American United States representatives
 Women in the United States House of Representatives

References

External links

Huffington Post: Rep. Diane Watson blog entries by the congresswoman

 
Hundreds attend PLP fundraiser The Royal Gazette, January 15, 2007
Governor reiterates UK's Independence stance to Rotarians, The Royal Gazette, June 25, 2008
Profile at Answers.com
Join California Diane Watson

1933 births
Living people
American people of Central African Republic descent
African-American state legislators in California
African-American women in politics
African-American members of the United States House of Representatives
Democratic Party California state senators
California State University, Los Angeles alumni
School board members in California
Female members of the United States House of Representatives
Harvard Kennedy School alumni
Los Angeles City College alumni
Democratic Party members of the United States House of Representatives from California
Politicians from Los Angeles
Anti-indigenous racism in the United States
Ambassadors of the United States to the Federated States of Micronesia
University of California, Los Angeles alumni
Women state legislators in California
Claremont Graduate University alumni
African-American diplomats
2012 United States presidential electors
21st-century American politicians
21st-century American women politicians
Susan Miller Dorsey High School alumni
American women ambassadors
20th-century American politicians
20th-century American women politicians
20th-century African-American women
20th-century African-American politicians
21st-century African-American women
20th-century American diplomats